Bernhard Jetter (February 26, 1862 – August 23, 1927) was a German-born soldier in the U.S. Army who served with the 7th U.S. Cavalry during the Indian Wars. He was one of twenty men who received the Medal of Honor for gallantry against the Dakota at the Battle of Wounded Knee, but now called the Wounded Knee Massacre, in South Dakota on December 29, 1890.

Biography
Bernhard Jetter was born in Württemberg, Germany in 1862. He immigrated into the United States at New York City, New York on April 17, 1881. He enlisted in K Troop, 7th Cavalry Regiment, U.S. Army on May 5, 1883 in New York City. He was promoted to sergeant; he was discharged on May 4, 1888 upon his termination of service at Rapid City, Dakota Territory with a character rating of excellent. Bernard Jetter (sic) re-enlisted near Rapid City on June 5, 1888. Jetter was among the cavalry troops sent to arrest Chief Big Foot and disarm his Sioux followers and, on the morning of December 29, 1890, surrounded their camp on the banks of Wounded Knee Creek. In the ensuing Wounded Knee Massacre, Jetter and several other soldiers took part in search-and-destroy missions along White Clay Creek and were cited for "distinguished bravery" in skirmishes against the Sioux. Jetter himself was witnessed "killing an Indian who was in the act of killing a wounded man" in his unit. He and nineteen other members of his regiment were awarded the Medal of Honor on April 24, 1891. Jetter was discharged as a first sergeant on June 4, 1893 at Fort Sheridan. He immediately re-enlisted on June 5, 1893 at Fort Sheridan. Jetter was naturalized as a U.S. Citizen on July 10, 1896 in the U.S. District Court in New York, New York; his occupation at the time was "U.S. soldier." He was discharged by authority of a special order on September 4, 1896 as a first sergeant at Fort Huachuca, Arizona Territory was a character rating of excellent.

Jetter married Rose Elizabeth Wagner on June 3, 1916 in New York, New York, giving his marital status as widowed. 

Jetter returned to Brooklyn after leaving military service and died in Brooklyn on August 23, 1927 at the age of 65; his wife Rose survived him. He was interred at Cypress Hills National Cemetery.

Medal of Honor citation
Rank and organization: Sergeant, Company K, 7th U.S. Cavalry. Place and date: At Sioux campaign, December 1890. Entered service at: ------. Birth: Germany. Date of issue: 24 April 1891.

Citation:

Distinguished bravery.

See also

List of Medal of Honor recipients for the Indian Wars

References

1862 births
1927 deaths
American military personnel of the Indian Wars
United States Army Medal of Honor recipients
People from New York City
United States Army soldiers
German-born Medal of Honor recipients
German emigrants to the United States
American Indian Wars recipients of the Medal of Honor
Pine Ridge Campaign